The 1983 Individual Speedway World Championship was the 38th edition of the official World Championship to determine the world champion rider. It was the first time the World Final had been held in West Germany.

Final summary
Australian Champion Billy Sanders, in career best form and always at his best on the longer tracks like those in his native Australia, scored his best ever World Championship placing by finishing second, with England's 1980 World Champion Michael Lee finishing third.

With both Sanders and former champion Lee in good form, and with the winner of the previous two World Finals Bruce Penhall having retired from speedway while on the podium at the 1982 World Final, the 1983 final was expected to be one of the most open in years. Others including Kenny Carter (England), Dennis Sigalos (United States), and Danes Ole Olsen, Hans Nielsen and Erik Gundersen, were all expected to challenge. Like surprise winner Jerzy Szczakiel who won at home in Poland in 1973, Egon Müller was expected to do well in front of his home crowd, but wasn't among the pre-meeting favourites.

In his last World Final appearance, "The Great Dane" Ole Olsen, the 1971, 1975 and 1978 World Champion, finished 6th with 10 points. He fittingly won his last ride, defeating Gundersen, Czechoslovakia's Jiří Štancl, and American Lance King in Heat 18.

New Zealand Qualification

New Zealand Final

 27 February 1983
  Christchurch
 First 2 to Overseas final

British Qualification

British Final
June 1, 1983
 Coventry, Brandon Stadium
First 8 to Overseas final

Swedish Qualification

Sweden Final

First 4 to Nordic final

Intercontinental Round

Australian Final
January 21, 1983
 Adelaide
Referee: Sam Bass
First 2 to Overseas final

Danish Final

May 9, 1983
 Fjelsted
First 6 to Nordic final

American Final
June 11, 1983
 Long Beach, Veterans Memorial Stadium
First 4 to Overseas final

Nordic Final
June 12, 1983
 Elgane
First 6 to Intercontinental final plus 1 reserve

Overseas Final

 July 17, 1983
  Manchester, Belle Vue
 First 10 to the Intercontinental Final plus 1 reserve

Intercontinental Final

 7 August 1983
  London, White City Stadium
 First 11 to World Final plus 1 reserve

Continental Round

Continental Final

 6 August 1983
  Rybnik
 First 5 to World Final plus 1 reserve

World Final

September 4, 1983
 Norden, Motodrom Halbemond
Referee: Rolf Randborg

References

1983
Individual Speedway World
Individual Speedway World
Speedway competitions in Germany